Kamenka is a rural locality (a village) in Danilovskoye Rural Settlement, Melenkovsky District, Vladimir Oblast, Russia. The population was 13 as of 2010.

Geography 
Kamenka is located on the Kamenka River, 37 km southwest of Melenki (the district's administrative centre) by road. Mildevo is the nearest rural locality.

References 

Rural localities in Melenkovsky District